Mark Robert Bainbridge (born 11 May 1973) is a former English cricketer.  Bainbridge was a right-handed batsman who bowled slow left-arm orthodox.  He was born in Isleworth, London.

Bainbridge represented the Surrey Cricket Board in List A cricket.  His debut List A match came against Norfolk in the 1999 NatWest Trophy.  From 1999 to 2001, he represented the Board in 4 List A matches, the last of which came against Surrey in the 2001 Cheltenham & Gloucester Trophy.  In his 5 List A matches, he scored 151 runs at a batting average of 30.20, with a high score of 38.  In the field he took 2 catches.

References

External links
Mark Bainbridge at Cricinfo
Mark Bainbridge at CricketArchive

1961 births
Living people
People from Isleworth
Cricketers from Greater London
English cricketers
Surrey Cricket Board cricketers